Água Viva is an album by Brazilian singer Gal Costa, released in 1978. The album contains hits such as "Paula e Bebeto", which was included in the soundtrack of the Brazilian TV series, Malu Mulher.

Track listing
"Olhos Verdes" (Vicente Paiva) – 3:12
"Folhetim" (Chico Buarque) – 3:30
"De Onde Vem O Baião" (Gilberto Gil) – 3:09
"O Bem Do Mar" (Dorival Caymmi) – 1:42
"Mãe" (Caetano Veloso) – 3:34
"Vida de Artista" (Sueli Costa, Abel Silva) – 3:25
"Paula E Bebeto" (Milton Nascimento, Caetano Veloso) – 2:07
"A Mulher" (Caetano Veloso) – 1:55
"Pois É" (Chico Buarque, Tom Jobim) – 1:49
"Qual É, Baiana?" (Caetano Veloso, Moacyr Albuquerque) – 2:58
"Cadê" (Ruy Guerra, Milton Nascimento) – 3:26
"O Gosto Do Amor" (Gonzaguinha) – 4:02

Personnel
Perinho Albuquerque – Producer
Ary Carvalhaes and Paulinho Chocolate – Engineer
Luigi Hoffer – Mixing
Aldo Luiz – Layout Design
Guilherme Pereira – Management

References

Gal Costa albums
1978 albums